The Fremont River is a  long river in southeastern Utah, United States that flows from the Johnson Valley Reservoir, which is located on the Wasatch Plateau near Fish Lake, southeast through Capitol Reef National Park to the Muddy Creek near Hanksville where the two rivers combine to form the Dirty Devil River, a tributary of the Colorado River.

Course
The Johnson Valley Reservoir is fed by Sevenmile Creek (from the north) and Lake Creek (from the southwest). The Fremont River passes through Fremont, Loa, Lyman, Bicknell, Teasdale, and Torrey and provides year-round irrigation for the agricultural lands of Rabbit Valley and Caineville. Then it heads through Hanksville and afterward to its mouth.

Miscellaneous
The Fremont River has a drainage area of  fed by spring snowmelt off Thousand Lake Mountain, Boulder Mountain, and the northern Henry Mountains. The river is named after John Charles Frémont. It gives its name to the Fremont culture, a Precolumbian archaeological culture.

Flow
Flow (ft^3/s), by month (1977–2003), at Bicknell gauging station:

See also

 List of Utah rivers
 List of tributaries of the Colorado River

References

External links

Rivers of Utah
Rivers of Wayne County, Utah
Rivers of Sevier County, Utah
Capitol Reef National Park
Tributaries of the Colorado River in Utah